William Augustus Miller (August 3, 1900 – February 16, 1992) was an American football and basketball coach and college athletics administrator. He served as the head football coach at Texas Wesleyan College—now known as Texas Wesleyan University—in Fort Worth, Texas from 1937 to 1941 and West Texas State Teachers College—now known as West Texas A&M University—in Canyon, Texas–from 1942 to 1946, compiling a career college football coaching record of 41–32–3. Miller was also the head basketball coach at Texas Wesleyan from 1947 to 1942 and West Texas State from 1942 to 1957, tallying a career college basketball coaching mark of 283–154. His basketball teams won three Border Conference championships and made an appearance in the 1955 NCAA basketball tournament.

Miller coached at Trinidad High School in Trinidad, Colorado for 10 years before he was hired at Texas Wesleyan in 1937.

Miller was born in Pine Grove, Texas. He received a bachelor's degree from West Texas State and a master's degree from Texas Tech University. He died on February 16, 1992, at a hospital in Denton, Texas.

Head coaching record

College football

College basketball

Notes

References

External links
 

1900 births
1992 deaths
American men's basketball coaches
Texas Wesleyan Rams football coaches
Texas Wesleyan Rams men's basketball coaches
West Texas A&M Buffaloes athletic directors
West Texas A&M Buffaloes basketball coaches
West Texas A&M Buffaloes football coaches
West Texas A&M Buffaloes football players
High school football coaches in Colorado
High school football coaches in Texas
Texas Tech University alumni
People from Henderson County, Texas
Coaches of American football from Texas
Players of American football from Texas
Basketball coaches from Texas